The Zalawadi goat breed from the Surendranagar and Rajkot regions of Gujarat in India is used for the production of milk, meat, and fiber. Zalawadi goats compromise 27.8% of the goat population in Surendranagar.  The goats are also known by the local name Tara Bakari.

Physical description
A long legged type of goat. Coat is predominantly black with speckled ears. Horns are upward and backward pointing corkscrews with drooping, leaf-shaped ears.

Statistics
Milk yield = 2.02±0.18 kg in 197.2±5.8d of lactation with an average productive life of 5-6 lactations. The birth rate is 55% twins and 2% triplets.

References

Sources
Zalawadi goat

Dairy goat breeds
Meat goat breeds
Fiber-producing goat breeds
Goat breeds originating in India
Goat breeds
Animal husbandry in Gujarat